Sindy Auvity (born 2 July 1995), commonly known mononymously as Sindy, is the lead vocalist of the French hip hop band Team BS. After the success of the band's album, Sindy announced that she would be releasing her own solo album. Selfie was released in July 2015 and reached 25 in the French charts.

Personal life
Sindy has revealed that she has been bullied in the past.

Discography

References

1995 births
Living people
French women singers
21st-century French singers
21st-century French women